Viktor Valeryevich Zuyev, also spelled sometimes as Viktar Valeryevich Zuyeu (Łacinka: Viktar Valierjevič Zujeŭ; ; born May 22, 1983) is a former amateur boxer from Belarus, best known for winning the heavyweight silver medal at the 2004 Summer Olympics in Athens, Greece.

Career
The southpaw won a silver medal at the Euro 2004.

Olympic Results 2004:
Defeated Daniel Betti (Italy) RSC 1 (1:15)
Defeated Devin Vargas (United States) 36-27
Defeated Mohamed Elsayed (Egypt) walkover, Elsayed broke his arm in quarterfinal.
Lost to Odlanier Solis Fonte (Cuba) 13-22

Since then he suffered several setbacks.
2005 he lost at the world championships early to Cuban Luis Ortiz.

2006 he suffered a KO 1 to Elchin Alizade at the Euros.

2007 at the world championships he exited early against Lithuania's Vitalijus Subacius.

In 2008 he turned the tables on Subacius and beat him in a qualifier to punch his Olympic ticket. In Beijing he ran right into Clemente Russo and lost 1:7.

Super Heavyweight
At the 2009 World Amateur Boxing Championships he competed at super heavyweight and reached the semifinal vs Didier Bence, Marko Tomasović (KO1) and Denis Sergeev. There he again fell by KO1 this time to Olympic Gold medallist Roberto Cammarelle.

References

 Amateur results

1983 births
Living people
Boxers at the 2004 Summer Olympics
Boxers at the 2008 Summer Olympics
Olympic boxers of Belarus
Olympic silver medalists for Belarus
Olympic medalists in boxing
Medalists at the 2004 Summer Olympics
Belarusian male boxers
AIBA World Boxing Championships medalists
Heavyweight boxers